Cnemaspis shevaroyensis, also known as the Shevaroy dwarf gecko, is a species of gecko endemic to India.

References

 http://reptile-database.reptarium.cz/species?genus=Cnemaspis&species=shevaroyensis

shevaroyensis
Reptiles of India
Reptiles described in 2019